Romain Cannone (born 12 April 1997) is a French right-handed épée fencer, 2022 team world champion, 2022 individual world champion, and 2021 individual Olympic champion.

After winning gold in individual men's épée at the 2020 Tokyo Olympic Games and the 2022 World Fencing Championships in Cairo, Egypt, Cannone became the first person to win back-to-back world titles in individual men's épée since Pavel Kolobkov's world titles in 1993 and 1994.

He was named Sportsperson of the Year for 2020 in Colmar, France.

Career
Canonne was born in France, but moved to Brazil with his family while in kindergarten. He moved with his family to New York City's Lower East Side while still young, and began fencing there at the age of 12, subsequently training under Michael Mokretsov at the age of 13 at the New York Fencing Academy in Coney Island. In 2019, Cannone ranked 30th in the Individual Men's épée World Championships in Budapest. Prior to his gold medal in the 2020 Tokyo Olympics, his highest ranking was 7th place at the Vancouver World Cup on 8 February 2019. As of 2019, when Cannone qualified for the Olympics, he was a student at Skema Business School.

2020 Olympics
Cannone, originally only scheduled as a replacement athlete, was the youngest member of the 2020 French team. However, on 18 June 2021, when team member Daniel Jérent was removed from the team for a failed drug test, Cannone was selected to take his place. On 25 July 2021, he defeated the Russian Sergey Bida in the quarter-finals (15–12) and the Ukrainian Ihor Reizlin (15–10) in the semi-finals, and went on to win  the gold medal (15–10) against the previous world champion Gergely Siklósi. Cannone's win has been described as "surprising" being his first international medal in individual competition. He became the first French Olympic champion in individual fencing since Brice Guyart won the gold medal in foil in 2004.

Medal record

Olympic Games

World Championship

European Championship

World Cup

References

External links

Living people
1997 births
French male épée fencers
Olympic fencers of France
Olympic gold medalists for France
Olympic medalists in fencing
Fencers at the 2020 Summer Olympics
Medalists at the 2020 Summer Olympics
Mediterranean Games silver medalists for France
Mediterranean Games medalists in fencing
Competitors at the 2018 Mediterranean Games
20th-century French people
21st-century French people
World Fencing Championships medalists
Sportspeople from Boulogne-Billancourt